Oldřichov is a municipality and village in Přerov District in the Olomouc Region of the Czech Republic. It has about 100 inhabitants.

History
Oldřichov was founded in 1787. It was originally named Ulrychovice and renamed to its current name in 1920.

References

Villages in Přerov District